Neritina iris is a species of sea snail, a marine gastropod mollusk in the family Neritidae.

Distribution
Mayotte.

Description

Human use
It is a part of ornamental pet trade for freshwater aquaria.

References

External links

Neritidae
Gastropods described in 1849